The NSW TrainLink fleet of trains serves the areas outside Sydney, Australia, mainly interurban and interstate lines. The NSW TrainLink fleet consists of both diesel and electric traction, with the oldest of the fleet being the V sets and the youngest being the H sets.

Interurban and outer suburban fleet 
The network's interurban services are designed with extra facilities (such as armrests and on-board toilets) to cater for longer distance journeys connecting Sydney with regional centres. All interurban trains are air-conditioned.

Electric

V set (1970–1989) 

V sets form the backbone of NSW TrainLink's interurban services. They were manufactured by Comeng and were introduced between 1970 and 1989. They currently run in four or eight car configurations containing toilets on the Central Coast & Newcastle Line and the Blue Mountains Line to Lithgow.

H set (OSCAR) (2006–2012) 

H sets (nicknamed OSCARs, for Outer Suburban CARs) were introduced from 2006 and operate as 4 or 8 car sets on the Blue Mountains Line, Central Coast & Newcastle Line and South Coast Line. The OSCARs were initially ordered to replace the G set Tangaras on outer suburban runs, however in addition to this they have also been used to replace some of the older interurban V sets which have been retired. They contain toilets and feature suburban style 3×2 seating and perform some suburban only work in addition to their main outer suburban duties.

D sets (Mariyung) 

In May 2014, the NSW Government announced its intention to purchase new trains, with a fleet of around 520 new carriages for the NSW TrainLink intercity network expected to begin service in 2019. These trains would replace all V Sets and at least some original quiet carriage-based, OSCARS on intercity services. The displaced OSCAR trains would then be re-allocated to suburban services, while the entire V Set fleet would be withdrawn.

In August 2016, the contract to supply new intercity trains was awarded to RailConnect, a joint venture of Hyundai Rotem, Mitsubishi Electric and UGL Rail. The first was delivered in late 2019.

Diesel 
The network's diesel multiple units are run on the Southern Highlands Line, the far reaches of the South Coast Line (between Kiama and Bomaderry), services on the Blue Mountains Line that extend to Bathurst, and the regional Hunter Line.

Endeavour railcar (1994) 

Endeavour railcars were introduced in 1994. The 28 carriages were manufactured by Adtranz. They serve all lines on which diesel trains operate. The New South Wales Xplorer is a long distance configuration of the same basic design.

Hunter railcar (2006–2007) 

Hunter railcars are the newest members of NSW TrainLink's diesel fleet, serving the Hunter line only. Introduced between 22 November 2006 and 10 September 2007, they replaced the old 620/720 railcars. Features of the series of the 7 2-car trains include air-conditioning, security cameras, on-board passenger information displays and digital voice announcements.

Regional and Interstate fleet 
All of the regional and interstate fleet are diesel powered and are single deck trains.

Xplorer (1993–1995)

XPT (1981–1994)

CAF Civity (from 2023)

Maintenance depots 
The electric trains are tied to different maintenance depots. V sets are maintained at Flemington Maintenance Depot and H sets are maintained at UGL Rail Maintrain. D sets are maintained at Kangy Angy Maintenance Centre on the Central Coast & Newcastle Line. XPTs and Xplorers are maintained at the XPT Service Centre just south of Sydenham station. The future CAF Civity trains will be maintained at Dubbo Maintenance Centre.

See also 
 Rail rollingstock in New South Wales

References

External links 
 NSW TrainLink
 Transport for NSW suburban and interurban Fleet - Transport for NSW webpage of NSW TrainLink interurban rollingstock.
 NSW TrainLink Fleet - Transport for NSW webpage of its interstate rolling stock

 
Australian railway-related lists
New South Wales-related lists